The pale stigma (Mesogona acetosellae) is a moth of the family Noctuidae. It is found in central and southern Europe, Turkey, the Caucasus, Armenia, Kazakhstan and from western Siberia to the Altai.

Description
The wingspan is 40–44 mm. Forewing greyish ochreous, flushed with brownish or rufous, and with dark irroration; lines pale with dark edging, approximating on inner margin; upper stigmata large with
pale outlines: a submarginal row of dark spots between the veins; hindwing greyish ochreous, paler towards base: palpi pink, abdomen ochraceous. The form found in Siberia, eremicola Stgr, is paler, but covered with black striations. Larva dull flesh colour, dusted with black: dorsal line dull ochreous; head and thoracic plate brown.

Biology
Adults are on wing from August to September depending on the location. There is one generation per year.

The larvae feed on Prunus spinosa, Quercus, Crataegus and Populus species.

Subspecies
Mesogona acetosellae acetosellae 
Mesogona acetosellae anatolica (Turkey)

References

External links
Pale Stigma on UKmoths
Fauna Europaea
Lepiforum.de

Xyleninae
Moths of Europe
Moths of Asia
Taxa named by Michael Denis
Taxa named by Ignaz Schiffermüller